Calystegia sepium (hedge bindweed, Rutland beauty, bugle vine, heavenly trumpets, bellbind, granny-pop-out-of-bed and many others) is a species of flowering plant in the family Convolvulaceae. It has a subcosmopolitan distribution throughout temperate regions of the North and South hemispheres.

Description

The flowers are white, or pale pink with five darker stripes, produced from late spring to the end of summer. In the UK, between July and September. In the bud, they are covered by large green but tinged with crimson bracts which remain but scarcely overlap and do not cover the sepals of the open flower. The open flowers are trumpet-shaped,  diameter, white, or pale pink with white stripes. After flowering, the fruit develops as an almost spherical capsule, which is hidden by the bracts.

The plant thrives in hedges, fields, borders, roadsides and open woods.

Hedge bindweed is toxic, containing calystegine alkaloids. It can kill an adult.

Identification
There are several species of Calystegia which and occur in similar habitats and can be difficult to distinguish, especially when not in flower. It is common practice in Britain to treat C. sepium, C. silvatica and C. pulchra as an aggregate, usually recorded as "C. sepium agg.", whenever identification is uncertain. The use of this term sometimes creates confusion about which taxon is being discussed.

The best way to separate hedge bindweed (sepium) from the other taxa is by the bracteoles, which subtend the flower and wholly or partially encompass the sepals. Hedge bindweed has two rather long, narrow bracteoles which do not touch each other, whereas both large bindweed (silvatica) and hairy bindweed (pulchra) have shorter, wider bracteoles which overlap where they meet.

Taxonomy
Other vernacular names include greater bindweed, bearbind, hedge convolvulus, hooded bindweed, old man's nightcap, wild morning glory, bride's gown, wedlock (referring to the white gown-like flowers and the binding nature of the vine), white witches hat, belle of the ball, devil's guts and hedgebell. A common childhood pastime in the UK is to 'pop' the flowers from the sepals while chanting "Granny, granny — pop out of bed".

Several regional subspecies have been described, but they are not considered distinct by all authorities:
Calystegia sepium subsp. americana. North America.
Calystegia sepium subsp. angulata. North America.
Calystegia sepium subsp. appalachiana. Eastern North America.
Calystegia sepium subsp. binghamiae. Western North America (California).
Calystegia sepium subsp. erratica. North America.
Calystegia sepium subsp. limnophila. Southern North America.
Calystegia sepium subsp. roseata. Western Europe, coasts. Flowers pink.
Calystegia sepium subsp. sepium. Europe, Asia.
Calystegia sepium subsp. spectabilis. Siberia. Flowers often pinkish.

As a weed

While appreciated for its flowers, C. sepium can grow as a vigorous weed plant, and is able to overwhelm and pull down cultivated plants including shrubs and small trees. It is self-seeding (seeds can remain viable as long as 30 years), can rapidly regrow into whole plants from individual pieces such as discarded roots, and the success of its creeping rhizomes (they can be as long as ) cause it to be a persistent weed and have led to its classification in some American states as a noxious weed.

C. sepium is highly sensitive to glyphosate, a systemic herbicide, but eradication may require several doses.

Similar species
Calystegia silvatica, giant bindweed, is sometimes treated as a subspecies of C. sepium
Convolvulus arvensis, field bindweed, is a similar vine with much smaller features. The rear margin leaf projections are sharp. 
The leaves of Ipomoea pandurata, wild potato vine, are shaped like a heart, not like an arrowhead.

Gallery

References

External links

Flora Europaea: Calystegia sepium
 . One of the Flowers of Loveliness for 1838 combining an engraved picture, White Rose and Night Convolvulus, from Eliza Sharpe with a poetical illustration from Letitia Elizabeth Landon.
Species Accounts, Botanical Society of Britain and Ireland: Calystegia sepium
Oregon State Weed Guide
Ohio Perennial & Biennial Weed Guide

sepium
Flora of North America
Flora of Asia
Flora of Europe
Flora of Western Australia
Plants described in 1753
Taxa named by Carl Linnaeus
Taxa named by Robert Brown (botanist, born 1773)